Leptotes pohlitinocoi is a species of orchid endemic to Brazil (Bahia).

References

External links 

pohlitinocoi
Endemic orchids of Brazil
Orchids of Bahia